A clutter fence is a device used with some radar systems to prevent reflections from nearby objects reaching the receiver. They are normally constructed out of conventional metal fencing material. They may serve a secondary role in protecting crews on the ground from the microwave signal of some very high-powered radars.

References
 

Radar theory